Filiksinos Yusuf Çetin (born 20 August 1954) is a Syriac Aramaic Christian religious leader who has been serving since 1986 as the Patriarchal Vicar of the Syriac Orthodox Church in Istanbul and Ankara.

A native of Turkey's Dargeçit district, known to its Syriac native population as Kerburan, parts of which are located in southeastern Anatolia's Mardin Province, Yusuf Çetin expressed interest in Syriac Church doctrine at an early age.  In the course of completing his secondary education, he also learned the Syriac language and subsequently attended his home province's Mor Gabriel Monastery, Syriac Orthodoxy's oldest surviving monastic institution.  Having demonstrated exceptional acuity for learning and spiritual instruction, he was ordained a priest in 1971, at the unusually early age of 17, and shortly thereafter was entrusted with instructing theology to the next generation of devout youth.  By 1977 he was consecrated with the title of "spiritual" and received an invitation from Patriarch Moran Mor Ignatius Zakka I Iwas to come to Syria, thus enabling his attendance at Damascus' St. Mor Efrem School of Theology.  Receiving a diploma in the aftermath of three years' intensive study, he ultimately received appointment as dean of the school.

On 28 September 1986, upon the request of Istanbul's community of Syriac faithful, Mor Filiksinos Yusuf Çetin was elevated by the Patriarch to the rank of Metropolitan bishop and assigned to the Diocese of İstanbul and Ankara as the Patriarchal Vicar.  Twenty years into his service, on 30 November 2006, he held talks with Pope Benedict XVI as the pontiff initiated his 2006 papal journey to Turkey.

References
Ecclesiastical biography {with photograph} of "ARCHBISHOP Mor Filiksinos YUSUF ÇETÝN Syrian Orthodox Community of Istanbul & Ankara Clerical Leader and Deputy Patriarch" at suryanikadim.org {Syrian Church website}
Brief biographical sketch of Mor Filiksinos YUSUF ÇETİN at biyografi.net 
	"Syriac community ritual takes place in Adıyaman" Today's Zaman (30 June 2008)

Turkish religious leaders
Turkish Oriental Orthodox Christians
Turkish people of Assyrian descent
People from Dargeçit
1954 births
Living people
Alumni of St Cross College, Oxford
Syriac Orthodox Church bishops